Grace Latz (born February 21, 1988) is an American rower  and 2016 Olympian. In 2014, Latz won a bronze medal at the 2014 World Rowing Championships in the women’s quadruple sculls. In 2015 Latz, Kristine O'Brien, Adrienne Martelli and Grace Luczak took the gold medal in the coxless four at the 2015 World Rowing Championships. In 2016, Latz was a finalist in the women’s quadruple sculls in the 2016 Summer Olympic Games in Rio.

References

 

1988 births
Living people
American female rowers
Sportspeople from Jackson, Michigan
World Rowing Championships medalists for the United States
Rowers at the 2016 Summer Olympics
Olympic rowers of the United States
21st-century American women